The Retreat Building is the official retreat residence of the President of India at Chharabra, Shimla, in the state of Himachal Pradesh. The President stays at the building for at least two weeks during summer and conducts official business. It is located 13 km away from the city Shimla and is a thousand feet higher than the Shimla Ridge Top, which is part of the Himalayas.

The other presidential homes are Rashtrapati Bhavan in New Delhi, and Rashtrapati Nilayam in Hyderabad, Telangana.

History
The building was originally constructed by the then Medical Superintendent of Simla, whose name is not known (referred to merely as Mr. C in Simla Past and Present by Edward J. Buck). The Retreat was taken on lease from Raja of Koti by Lord William Hay. During this period, the local population called it "Larty Sahib Ki Kothi", i.e. house of Mr. Larty, as Lord William Hay was named by locals. The lease deed contained stipulations that: the two roads from Simla and Mashobra village should, in the interest of native population of Koti State, be open to the public; no trees should be felled; and no cattle be slaughtered on the grounds. The lease of the Retreat was then taken by Sir William Mansfield, Commander-in-Chief, and then By Sir Edward Buck in 1881. In 1896, Raja of Koti used his right of preemption and took the possession of the estate. Thereafter the Retreat was consigned to the government on permanent lease by Raja of Koti. The Earl of Elgin was the first Viceroy of India to have used the Retreat as a viceregal residence. Lord Elgin secured use of the Retreat for future viceroys and constantly spent his weekends there.

Design
The architecture and the picturesque surrounding of the place make it a major tourist attraction in Shimla. The outstanding feature of this building is that it is purely a wooden structure with dhajji wall construction.

See also
 List of official residences of India
 Rashtrapati Nilayam
 Rashtrapati Niwas
 Rashtrapati Ashiana

References

Official residences in India
Presidential residences in India
Buildings and structures in Shimla

British-era buildings in Himachal Pradesh